Syed Ahmed (6 March 1943 – 27 September 2015) was an Indian politician, author and a member of the Congress Party. He was sworn in as the Governor of Manipur on 16 May 2015, but only served four months before dying in office on 27 September. During his short tenure as governor, the Manipur Tenants, Visitors and Migrant Workers Bill, 2015 was passed by the Manipur Assembly on 15 March.

He died of cancer on 27 September 2015 at Lilavati Hospital Bandra, Mumbai, India at the age of 72 whilst in office as a state governor. He was survived by his wife and two children, an only son as well as an only daughter.

Early life
Ahmed held two master's degrees in both Hindi and English as well as a doctorate in Urdu. He has written an autobiography, Pagdandi se Shahar Tak  and his other works include Maktal se Manzil, Kafas se Chaman and Jange-Azaadi Me Urdu Shayari.

Political career
Ahmed joined the Indian National Congress in 1977. He was elected to the Vidhan Sabha five times as a representative of the Nagpada constituency in Mumbai. He also served as a state minister in Maharashtra.

On 26 August 2011, Indian President Pratibha Patil appointed Ahmed as the eighth Governor of the northern state of Jharkhand. He was chosen to succeed M. O. H. Farook, who was appointed Governor of Kerala on the same day by President Patil. Syed Ahmed was sworn in as the Governor of Jharkhand on 4 September 2011. Ahmed was administered the oath of office by acting Jharkhand Chief Justice Prakash Chandra Tatiya at the state Raj Bhavan. Dr. Syed Ahmed was shifted to Manipur in May 2015.

On 16 May 2015, Dr. Syed Ahmed was sworn in as the Governor of Manipur at the Raj Bhavan in Imphal. The Chief Justice of Manipur High Court, Laxmi Kanta Mohapatra administered the oath of office and secretary to Dr. Syed Ahmed.

External links
 Profile

References

|-

1943 births
Governors of Jharkhand
Indian Shia Muslims
People from Faizabad
Politicians from Mumbai
Indian National Congress politicians from Maharashtra
2015 deaths
Indian people of Arab descent
Deaths from cancer in India
Indian political writers
Governors of Manipur
Members of the Maharashtra Legislative Assembly
Indian National Congress politicians from Uttar Pradesh